This page provides summaries of the CAF Third Round matches for the 2014 FIFA World Cup qualification. The ten group winners from the second round were drawn into five home-and-away ties.

Algeria, Cameroon, Ghana, Ivory Coast, and Nigeria won their respective ties and qualified for the 2014 FIFA World Cup. Exactly the same five African teams won the qualification for the 2010 FIFA World Cup.

Seeding
The teams were seeded based on the 12 September 2013 edition of the FIFA World Rankings (shown below, with their second-round groups in small brackets).

Matches
The draw of the play-offs was held on 16 September 2013 in Giza, Egypt. The matches were played in the periods 11–15 October and 15–19 November 2013.
Tie-break criteria

If teams are tied after the two-match series (on basis of Results, Goals Scored, Away Goals), then a Cup System will take effect.

Knockout format:
After the conclusion of the second match (i.e. 90 minutes of regulatory time), 30 minutes of extra-time will be played (2 x 15 minutes)
Goals scored during extra-time period will be decisive.

a) Team scoring greater number of goals advances.
b) If both teams score same number of goals, then team with more away goals advances.

If no goals are scored in the extra-time, then penalty kick procedures will apply, as described in the Laws of the Game.

|}

Ivory Coast won 4–2 on aggregate and qualified for the 2014 FIFA World Cup.

Nigeria won 4–1 on aggregate and qualified for the 2014 FIFA World Cup.

Cameroon won 4–1 on aggregate and qualified for the 2014 FIFA World Cup.

Ghana won 7–3 on aggregate and qualified for the 2014 FIFA World Cup.

3–3 on aggregate. Algeria won on the away goals rule and qualified for the 2014 FIFA World Cup.

Burkina Faso's protest that Algeria goalscorer Madjid Bougherra was ineligible to play in qualification has been thrown out by FIFA.

Goalscorers
There were 32 goals scored in 10 matches, for an average of 3.2 goals per match.
2 goals

  Jean Makoun
  Asamoah Gyan
  Salomon Kalou
  Emmanuel Emenike

1 goal

  Madjid Bougherra
  Sofiane Feghouli
  Carl Medjani
  Aristide Bancé
  Djakaridja Koné
  Jonathan Pitroipa
  Pierre Webó
  Benjamin Moukandjo
  Mohamed Aboutrika
  Mohamed Nagy Gedo
  Amr Zaki
  Behailu Assefa
  Kevin-Prince Boateng
  Abdul Majeed Waris
  Sulley Muntari
  Christian Atsu
  Didier Drogba
  Victor Moses
  Victor Obinna
  Papiss Cissé
  Moussa Sow
  Ahmed Akaïchi

1 own goal

  Wael Gomaa (playing against Ghana)
  Ludovic Sané (playing against Ivory Coast)

Notes

References

External links
Results and schedule (FIFA.com version)
Results and schedule (CAFonline.com version)

3
Qual